Ernst Tugendhat (8 March 1930 – 13 March 2023) was a Czechoslovakian-born German philosopher. He was a scion of the wealthy and influential Jewish Tugendhat family. They lived in Venezuela during the Nazi regime, and he studied first in Stanford University, then in Freiburg. He taught internationally in Europa and South America, with a focus on language analysis.

Life and career 

Tugendhat was born in Brno, Czechoslovakia, to Fritz and Greta (Löw-Beer) Tugendhat, a wealthy Jewish family that had commissioned Mies van der Rohe to design of the Villa Tugendhat in Brno. In 1938 the family escaped the Nazi regime, first to St. Gallen, Switzerland, and later to settle in Caracas, Venezuela.

Tugendhat studied classics at Stanford University from 1944 to 1949, and went on to do graduate work in philosophy and classics at the University of Freiburg. He achieved his doctorate there with a thesis on Aristotle in 1956. During the years 1956 to 1958 he performed post-doctoral research at the University of Münster. From then until 1964 he was an assistant professor in the department of philosophy at the University of Tübingen, where, after spending 1965 lecturing at the University of Michigan in Ann Arbor, he gained his habilitation in 1966 analyzing the concept of truth in Edmund Husserl and Martin Heidegger.

Tugendhat was professor at the University of Heidelberg from 1966 to 1975. During the 1960s and 1970s, Heidelberg developed into one of the main scenes of the left-wing student protests in Germany. Because of the student movement and as a protest against the situation at German universities in the 1970s, Tugendhat gave up his position and relocated to Starnberg, where Jürgen Habermas worked at the time. In 1980 he moved to Berlin, becoming, like his friend , a professor of philosophy at the Free University of Berlin.

Tugendhat retired in 1992, but was a visiting professor in philosophy at the Pontificia Universidad Católica de Chile, Santiago (1992–1996), a researcher at the Institute for Human Sciences, Vienna (1996), and visiting professor at Charles University in Prague (1997–1998).

Tugendhat died in Freiburg on 12 March 2023 at age 93.

Awards 
He received an honorary doctorate from the Universidad Autónoma de Madrid in 2005, and from the University of Zürich in 2009. In 2005 he was awarded the Meister Eckhart Prize; he donated the prize money to a school, "Talitha Kumi", in Beit Jala, Palestine.

Bibliography 
Publications by Tugendhat, many of them published by Suhrkamp, are held by the German National Library, including:
 1958: Ti kata tinos. Karl Alber, Freiburg. 
 1967: Der Wahrheitsbegriff bei Husserl und Heidegger. de Gruyter, Berlin. 
 1970: "The Meaning of 'Bedeutung' in Frege" (Analysis 30, pp 177–189)
 1975: Vorlesungen zur Einführung in die sprachanalytische Philosophie. Suhrkamp, Frankfurt am Main. , In English: Traditional and analytical philosophy. Lectures on the philosophy of language. Transl. by P.A. Gorner. Cambridge University Press, Cambridge 1982.
 1979: Selbstbewußtsein und Selbstbestimmung. Suhrkamp, Frankfurt. , In English: Self-consciousness and self-determination. Transl. by Paul Stern. Cambridge, Mass./ London: MIT Press, 1986. (= Studies in contemporary German social thought.)
 1984: Probleme der Ethik. Reclam, Stuttgart. 
 1992: Philosophische Aufsätze. Suhrkamp, Frankfurt. 
 1992: Ethics and Politics
 1993: Vorlesungen über Ethik. Suhrkamp, Frankfurt. 
 1995: "The Moral Dilemma in the Rescue of Refugees" (Social Research 62:1)
 2000: "Zeit und Sein in Heideggers Sein und Zeit" (Sats: Nordic Journal of Philosophy 1.1)
 2003: Egozentrizität und Mystik. Eine anthropologische Studie. C. H. Beck. 
 2007: Anthropologie statt Metaphysik. C. H. Beck.

References

Further reading 
 
 Bowie, Andrew. "Ernst Tugendhat, Philosophische Aufsätze" (European Journal of Philosophy 2/3 (1994), pp 345–351)

External links 
 Photograph of Ernst Tugendhat Kölner Stadtanzeiger
 "The time for philosophising is over" (interview) Sign and Sight 20 August 2007
 Interview with Santiago Zabala, author of The Hermeneutic Nature of Analytic Philosophy: A Study of Ernst Tugendhat Columbia University Press, archived 10 June 2010
 

1930 births
2023 deaths
People from Brno
Czech philosophers
German philosophers
Jewish philosophers
Philosophers of language
Philosophers of mind
Czech Jews
Venezuelan people of Czech descent
Czechoslovak emigrants to Venezuela
Czechoslovak emigrants to West Germany
Czechoslovak expatriates in Switzerland
Czechoslovak expatriates in the United States
German male writers
German expatriates in Chile
Charles University alumni
Stanford University alumni
University of Fribourg alumni
Academic staff of Charles University
Academic staff of Heidelberg University
Academic staff of the Free University of Berlin
Academic staff of the University of Tübingen
Academics of the University of Oxford
Academic staff of the Pontifical Catholic University of Chile